Daniela De Silva is an Italian mathematician known for her expertise in partial differential equations. She is an associate professor of mathematics at Barnard College and Columbia University.

Education and career
De Silva did her undergraduate studies in mathematics at the University of Naples Federico II, and earned a bachelor's degree there in 1997.
She completed her doctorate at the Massachusetts Institute of Technology in 2005. Her dissertation, Existence and Regularity of Monotone Solutions to a Free Boundary Problem, was supervised by David Jerison.

After postdoctoral research at the Mathematical Sciences Research Institute and a term as J. J. Sylvester Assistant Professor at Johns Hopkins University, she joined the Barnard and Columbia faculty in 2007.

Recognition
De Silva won the 2016 Sadosky Prize of the Association for Women in Mathematics for "fundamental contributions to the regularity theory of nonlinear elliptic partial differential equations and non-local integro-differential equations". In 2018, Barnard honored her with their Tow Professorship for Distinguished Scholars and Practitioners.

References

Year of birth missing (living people)
Living people
Italian mathematicians
Women mathematicians
University of Naples Federico II alumni
Massachusetts Institute of Technology School of Science alumni
Barnard College faculty
Columbia University faculty